Çun Lajçi, or Çun Dreli, is an Albanian musician, author, theater actor, film actor, drama teacher. He is famous for reciting poems to girls The Highland Lute (Lahuta e Malsisë). He is also a lahuta player. Lajçi has played over 200 roles and has been in 30 movies. He has been nominated twice as best actor in Serbia in the theater organization "Joakim Vujiq". He received the prize "Naim Frasheri" from the Albanian presidency. He has released two books, "Zjarr in Pashuar" and "Fake Noses in Bëhet vonë".

Background 
Lajçi was born December 18, 1945 in Drelaj, Rugova, Kosovo. He started school in Drelaj, and continued in Prizren at the drama school. He then proceeded to Prishtina. In 1970, he worked as an actor in Prishtina's city theater.

Work 
Cun Lajçi is a passionate activist and lahutor and has released many videos and songs where he dramatizes various political and historical events in Albanian national interests. He has released many recitals of Lahuta e Malsisë. Lajci himself has said that he lives a poor life and in a residence he received by Josip Bros Tito during the time of ancient Yugoslavia. On a television broadcast he received a renovation of his apartment with no charge for which he expressed gratitude, via a construction company sponsored by the program. He has strongly criticized Hashim Thaqi for deceiving the interests of the Albanian people.

Family 
In December 2017, the Albanian media reported that Lajçi's daughter, Bubulina Lajçi, had died from an overdose. Lajçi criticized the media claiming they made his daughter's death into sensational news. According to Lajçi, his daughter died in her mother's arms. In a broadcast, Lajçi said he had been poor for a long time and struggled to support his family. He often thought about going to New York and selling books on the street. Later, his sister also died, as he reported through social media.

References 

20th-century Albanian musicians
Albanian male stage actors
Albanian male film actors
Living people
Year of birth missing (living people)